The BMW K1200RS is a sport-touring motorcycle made by BMW.  The K1200RS is the last evolution of the BMW four-cylinder longitudinal engine, often referred to as the flying brick.  From 1996 to 2004 37,992 units were built at the BMW plant in Spandau Germany.

Model development 
Until 2000, the factory code was K589. For model year 2001 the K1200RS was revised with a new model code, K547.  That year the front headlight panel was modified, foot peg position was lowered and handlebars raised slightly.  Previously optional ABS was made standard in 2001.

In 2003, a 'GT' version of the K1200RS was introduced, featuring a slightly more upright seating position, adjustable footpegs, an electrically adjustable and somewhat larger windscreen and handguards - as well as colour-coded hard panniers as standard. The K1200GT was produced until 2005, after which it was replaced with a completely revised version with a transversely-mounted 4-inline engine for 2006.

References

External links

K1200RS
Shaft drive motorcycles
Sport touring motorcycles